Sam Kyle (1884 – 1962) was an Irish trade unionist and politician.

Born into a Protestant family at 57 Riga Street in Belfast on 7 November 1884, he was the son of Samuel Kyle, a draper, and Jane Wilson. Kyle joined the Independent Labour Party. He became active in the Workers' Union, eventually becoming a full-time organiser for the union.  At the 1918 general election, he stood in Belfast Shankill for the Belfast Labour Representation Committee. While unsuccessful, he was a prominent figure in the 1919 Belfast strike, and gained election to Belfast City Council in 1920.

The Labour Representation Committee became the main section of the Northern Ireland Labour Party (NILP), and Kyle was elected for the party at the 1925 Northern Ireland general election, to represent Belfast North, standing in opposition to partition. For the next four years, he acted as the leader of the NILP, pursuing a policy of working with sympathetic Nationalist Party MPs, and the independent Unionists Tommy Henderson and James Woods Gyle, to oppose the Ulster Unionist Party. After Nationalist Joe Devlin was suspended from the Parliament for attacking the Unionist Party as "villains, bullies, conspirators and ruffians", he led the NILP in joining with the Nationalists and two independent Unionist MPs in walking out, earning them suspensions from the body.

Following the restructuring of constituencies, Kyle stood in Belfast Oldpark in 1929, but was unsuccessful, losing by just 189 votes.

In 1932, Kyle became the Irish secretary of the Amalgamated Transport and General Workers Union and moved to Dublin. In 1940, he was the President of the Irish Trades Union Congress. In 1943, he was elected on the Labour Panel, and sat as an Irish Labour Party member of the Irish Senate, and re-elected in 1944 serving for five years in total.

References

1884 births
1962 deaths
Independent Labour Party politicians
Labour Party (Ireland) senators
Irish trade unionists
Leaders of political parties in Northern Ireland
Members of the House of Commons of Northern Ireland 1925–1929
Members of the 4th Seanad
Members of the 5th Seanad
Northern Ireland Labour Party members of the House of Commons of Northern Ireland
Protestant Irish nationalists
Members of the House of Commons of Northern Ireland for Belfast constituencies